Mighty Empires was a board game published by Games Workshop. It was intended to add a strategic layer to Warhammer Fantasy Battle giving rise to campaigns where the results of one battle would affect later battles, although the game included simple point based rules if the players did not have Warhammer Fantasy Battle or were unwilling to play out each battle.

Gameplay

Setup 
Prior to starting, the game map has to be assembled. The board consists of separate map hexagons representing coastal, highland and plains terrain, which are to be placed together to form a unique playing field. There are specific rules as to how the map tiles can be placed in order to maintain a sense of realism about the geography. For example, a river should continue until it terminates in a coastal, lake or swamp tile, rather than terminating abruptly by a blocking mountain or plains tile.

Players then chose starting positions (certain map hexes are designated as "capital spots") and then roll a six-sided die to see what settlements already exist in the map hexes immediately surrounding their capital.

The points worth of starting armies are then determined, either randomly (a number of dice rolled according to the number of settlements in that player's realm) or based on the players' available models. These are then divided into army banners and placed anywhere in the player's realm.

Play is then commenced.

Campaign Season 

Each year was split into the spring equinox, 6 summer months, autumn equinox and winter.

Spells could be cast during the equinoxes which could have significant effects on the campaign season. The spells available between the spring and autumn equinoxes differ.

During each summer month, the active player first calculates subsistence costs for each army. Subsistence represents the food and supplies an army would require and can be taken by foraging from the currently occupied map tile. Any shortfall must be made by baggage the army carries, else it can suffer troop loss.

Each army then scouted in the direction they wished to move to. If the tile was unexplored, the contents of the tile was determined by rolling on tile type specific scouting charts. Depending on the results, the army could encounter a friendly settlement, an independent settlement, nothing at all or a random event.
In the case of a settlement, it was permanently added to the map by placing the appropriate piece in the tile.

The army could then move into the map tile if desired, provided there was no blocking terrain.
Since a scouting roll was required every time an army wished to move, it was possible that the army could head in the wrong direction or not move at all, even if the target tile had been previously explored.

In the event that a hostile settlement or an opposing army was encountered, a battle was then fought.
The battle could be determined by Warhammer Fantasy Battle rules, or by a simple points based system.

In the case of sieges, the conflict could also be played out using Warhammer Siege rules.

After any battles had been fought, an army could raze the map tile, rendering it useless for further subsistence for a period of time, and then reorganise any armies in the same tile, including their baggage.

The next player then took their turn, following the same procedure. After all players took their turn, the next month began, with a random player starting first for that month.

After all 6 months had been completed, the autumn equinox spells were cast, then the winter season procedure began.

During the winter season, revenue (taxes) was collected, new units could be recruited, diplomacy and espionage could be performed and new settlements constructed.

The game turn then restarted with the spring equinox.

Simple rules for naval warfare were also included, although the later released Man o' War system could ostensibly be substituted.

Additional rules 
Expanded rules for difference race's subsistence were included, for example orcs and goblins suffered double penalties for shortfalls as the smaller individuals were eaten, while Skaven could only subsist from razed tiles.

A random name generator for several races was also included.

White Dwarf published additional rules for buildings (such as Wizard towers and bridges), massive siege units and printed additional map tiles.

2007 Edition 

This game was re-released in 2007 with new plastic pieces with a scaled down version of the rules, to be used to drive a campaign of miniature battles.

References 

Board games introduced in 1990
Games Workshop games
Warhammer Fantasy